Sporting Club de Huelva is a Spanish women's football club from Huelva, Andalusia. It was founded in Huelva in 2004 as a restructuring of an homonymous junior (men's) football club, which had been founded in 1979 and dissolved nine years later, by its original founder, Antonio Toledo, who has also served as the team's manager and sporting director.

History

Gaining promotion to the Liga F in just two seasons, Sporting Huelva debuted at the 2006–07 season. It has successfully avoided relegation for the past three seasons, actually ending the 2008–09 season just one point short for qualifying to the Copa de la Reina, losing the spot at the last matchday.

Next year Sporting was third in their group in the first stage of the newly reformed competition, narrowly missing qualification for the title contenders group. The team ranked again 3rd in its group in the second stage, qualifying for the Copa de la Reina for the first time. They qualified for the quarter-finals, eliminating Atlético Madrid before being ousted by Torrejón.

Financial difficulties conditioned the club's 2010–11 season. Following a weak performance in the first stage the team managed to recover in the second half of the season and was 2nd in their group, but Sporting had to renounce taking part in the Copa de la Reina.

Sporting chained four wins in the first weeks of the 2011–12 season, holding the lead of the table for the first time in its history. As of the end of 2011 the team stood 4th with 9 wins in 15 games, but after a less successful second half the team ended in the 8th position, was anyway is its best result to date. During the Christmas break president José Antonio Muñoz announced Sporting was in negotiations to become Recreativo Huelva's women's team for the 2012–13 season, but an agreement was not reached and Sporting was instead relocated to nearby Trigueros for the 2012–13 season.

On 17 May 2015, Sporting de Huelva won its first national title after achieving the 2015 Copa de la Reina by defeating Valencia CF in the final match by 2–1.

Players

Current squad

Former internationals

  Spain: Noelia Aybar, Priscila Borja, Alharilla Casado, Dolores Gallardo, Sarita Serrat
  Argentina: Florencia Bonsegundo
  Brazil: Renata Capobianco, Dayane da Rocha, Fabiana Simões, Thaís Picarte, Raquel
  Bulgaria: Silvia Radoyska
  Chile: Geraldine Leyton, Paloma López, Bárbara Santibáñez
  Colombia: Lady Andrade, Korina Clavijo, Sofía García
  Croatia: Ana Jelenčić
  Finland: Jenny Danielsson
  Gambia: Fatou Kanteh
  Ghana: Ernestina Abambila, Princella Adubea
  Kazakhstan: Irina Saratovtseva
  Mexico: Nayeli Rangel
  Morocco: Meryem Hajri
  Nigeria: Peace Efih
  Paraguay: Lice Chamorro
  Portugal: Rita Carneiro, Mónica Gonçalves
  Romania: Olivia Oprea, Elena Pavel, Laura Rus
  Slovakia: Lucia El-Dahaibiová
  Ukraine: Vera Djatel, Yulia Kornievets
  Zimbabwe: Rutendo Makore
  USA: Hannah Keane

Competition record

Titles
Copa de la Reina: (1)
2015

References

 
Women's football clubs in Spain
Association football clubs established in 1979
Association football clubs established in 2004
1979 establishments in Spain
Primera División (women) clubs